Jiang Hongde (4 July 1942 – 4 January 2020) was a Chinese engineer and professor at Tsinghua University.

Early life and education
Jiang was born in Hengyang, Hunan, Republic of China (1912-1949), on July 4, 1942, while his ancestral home was in Changsha. He attended Changsha No.1 High School. He received his bachelor's degree from Tsinghua University in 1968 and his master's degree from University of Science and Technology of China in 1981, respectively.

Career
After university, he worked at Qingdao Steam Turbine Factory between March 1968 and September 1978. In July 1981 he joined the Institute of Engineer Thermophysics, Chinese Academy of Engineering as a researcher, and served until November 2004. From 1987 to 1989 he was a visiting scholar at Virginia Tech. He joined the Communist Party of China in December 1992. In November 2004 he became a professor and doctoral supervisor at Tsinghua University.

Death
On January 4, 2020, he died of illness in Beijing.

Honours and awards
 1999 Member of the Chinese Academy of Engineering (CAE)

References

1942 births
2020 deaths
People from Hengyang
Tsinghua University alumni
Academic staff of Tsinghua University
University of Science and Technology of China alumni
Members of the Chinese Academy of Engineering
Engineers from Hunan